7/2 may refer to:
July 2 (month-day date notation)
February 7 (day-month date notation)
 A form of septuple meter
 A type of heptagram